The Midnight Life is the ninth studio album by American rapper DJ Quik. The album was released on October 14, 2014, by Mad Science Recordings and INgrooves Music Group.

The album spawned the singles "Life Jacket" and promo single "That Getter". The Midnight Life features guest appearances from Mack 10, El DeBarge, David Blake II, Bishop Lamont, Joi, Rob "Fonsksta" Bacon, Suga Free, Tay F 3rd Tweed Cadillac & Dom Kennedy. The album's production was handled mainly by DJ Quik himself.

Background
On December 9, 2013 in an interview with The Arsenio Hall Show's Extended Play in Los Angeles, Quik announced he received a budget for his upcoming ninth studio album and revealed his intention to channel the DJ Quik from 1989. The album title and release date were confirmed on September 17, 2014 in a press release from DJ Quik.

Singles
On September 24, 2014, DJ Quik released the album's first single, titled "Life Jacket", featuring frequent collaborator Suga Free and Dom Kennedy. The song was produced by DJ Quik himself. The snippet for the song along with a short music video for "Life Jacket", directed by Jon Casey, was released on June 11, 2013.

Critical reception

The Midnight Life received generally positive reviews from music critics. Fred Thomas of AllMusic said, "The album ... is a fun-loving affair, frequently switching styles from jazzy, sophisticated R&B workouts like "Pet Cemetery" to heavier trap and gangsta rap beats." Jayson Greene of Pitchfork Media stated, "The enlivening Quik touch is everywhere: 25 years into his career, he is still discovering how 2 or 3 sounds can make you momentarily forget how rap songs usually go." Darryl Robertson of XXL said, "The Midnight Life shows that Quik has a passion for making music, even if it necessarily doesn’t bless the ears of today’s hip-hop fans. In a genre where styles and flows change, Quik—including his content–remains the same, which validates his authenticity. However, he fails to adjust his style to the newer generation."

Commercial performance
The album debuted at number 63 on the Billboard 200, with sales of 5,097 copies in the United States.

Track listing

Personnel
Credits for The Midnight Life adapted from Allmusic.

 Richie Abbott – Project Manager, Publicity
 Jason Allen – Keyboards
 Rob "Fonksta" Bacon – Bass, Composer, Featured Artist, Guitar, Moog Synthesizer
 David "Preach" Bal4 – Keyboards, Piano, Producer
 David Blake II – Drum Programming, Featured Artist, Keyboards, Programming, Vocals
 Tweed Cadillac – Vocals
 El DeBarge – Composer, Featured Artist, Keyboards
 DJ Quik – Bass, Drum Programming, Drums, Horn, Instrumentation, Keyboards, Primary Artist, Producer
 David Foreman – Bass, Guitar
 Eboni Foster – Vocals
 Kenya Frank – Photography
 Brian Gardner – Mastering

 Joi – Vocals
 Dom Kennedy – Vocals
 Bishop Lamont – Vocals
 Mack 10 – Vocals
 Marco Olivia – Design, Packaging
 Rillah – Photography
 Courtney Robertson – Guitar
 Keith Ross – Bass, Composer
 Stephen Sletten – Engineer
 Keisha Smith – Vocals
 Suga Free – Vocals
 Tayf3rd – Vocals
 D-Loc Walker – Drums

Charts

Release history

References

2014 albums
Albums produced by DJ Quik
Mad Science Recordings albums
DJ Quik albums